, is a food in Japanese cuisine made from various marine animals that consists of small pieces of meat in a brown viscous paste of the animal's heavily salted, fermented viscera.

The raw viscera are mixed with about 10% salt, 30% malted rice, packed in a closed container, and fermented for up to a month. Shiokara is sold in glass or plastic containers.

The flavor is similar in saltiness and fishiness to that of European cured anchovies, but with a different texture. One of the best-known chinmi ("rare tastes"), it is quite strong and is considered something of an acquired taste even for the native Japanese palate.

It was a valuable protein in post-war Japan because food was scarce and it did not require refrigeration. It continued to be eaten as a condiment for rice and in bars.

One method of enjoying it is to consume the serving in one gulp and to follow it with a shot of straight whisky. Some bars in Japan specialize in shiokara.

Some types of shiokara

 Ika no shiokara—from cuttlefish "squid", the most common variety
 Hotaruika no shiokara—from firefly squid
 Katsuo no shiokara—from skipjack tuna
 Kaki no shiokara—from oyster
 Uni no shiokara—from sea urchin roe
 Ami no shiokara—from Mysidacea, a krill-like crustacean

Some shiokara types have special names:
  — from fiddler crab
  — from sea cucumber
 mefun — from chum salmon
  — from ayu
 shuto — from skipjack tuna (katsuo)

See also
Dayok, a similar Filipino preparation
Bekasang, a similar Indonesian preparation
Anchovies as food
Jeotgal
Natto

References 

Fermented fish
Fermented foods
Japanese seafood